The Stardust Best Thriller/Action Film is chosen by the readers of the annual Stardust magazine. The award honours individuals that have made an impact with their acting in thriller and/or action films.

The following is a list of award winners and the films for which they won.

See also 
 Stardust Awards
 Bollywood
 Cinema of India

References 

Stardust Awards